Brookside is an unincorporated community located in the town of Pensaukee, Oconto County, Wisconsin, United States.

Brookside was named from its location at a brook.

Notable people
Wally Ladrow, football player

References

Unincorporated communities in Oconto County, Wisconsin
Unincorporated communities in Wisconsin
Green Bay metropolitan area